Rester la même is French pop singer Lorie's fourth studio album, and her seventh album overall. It was released on 28 October 2005 and contains the hit single "Parti pour zouker". The album went to number one on the French Albums Chart and also achieved success in Belgium (Wallonia).

Track listing

 "Rester la même" — 3:46
 "Mille et une nuits" — 5:02
 "Un Amour XXL" — 3:11
 "S.O.S." — 5:25
 "Game Over" — 3:15
 "Fashion Victim" — 4:25
 "Ange et Démon" — 4:32
 "Parti pour zouker" — 5:08
 "Parle-lui" — 3:48
 "Santiago de Cuba" — 4:00
 "Pas comme les autres" — 4:31
 "Peur de l'amour" — 4:35
 "Je fonce" — 4:26
 "On chante" — 4:24
 "Quand tu danses" (remix edit) — 4:16
 "Un Signe du destin" — 3:19
 "Si demain..." — 5:28

Certifications

Charts

References

2005 albums
Lorie (singer) albums
Sony Music France albums